Algas calcareas, also known as AlgaeCal, is a plant-based dietary supplement derived from Lithothamnion superpositum, a red marine algae native to South America and is a source of calcium, magnesium, and other trace minerals. Several studies have shown safety and improvement in bone density.

Background
Algas calcareas was first found by Dr. Marcos Norman to reduce fusion temperatures in steel manufacturing. However, Dr. Norman became so fascinated with the properties of this mineral source, he left Morris Kwugsem International to begin a study on this South American marine algae that has lasted for 29 years.

References

External links
Fat Burning Supplements
Supplement Reviews Website

Dietary supplements